Andreas Jämtin (born May 4, 1983) is a Swedish professional ice hockey player.

Playing career 
Jämtin is a winger who, despite his size, is very aggressive and plays with lot of intensity. Detroit Red Wings' assistant general manager Jim Nill commented on Jämtin's playing style as "he's a pest on the ice".

Jämtin was drafted in the 2001 NHL Entry Draft by the Detroit Red Wings with their 5th round pick, in the 157th overall selection. For season 2006–07 Jämtin waited for contract offers from NHL but due to not receiving any offers signed a one-year contract with the Swedish club HV71. After the 2006–07 season, he extended the contract with another three years. On 16 June 2008 it was reported that Jämtin signed with the New York Rangers as a free agent. After only having played four games in the AHL with Hartford Wolf Pack and five games with Charlotte Checkers in the ECHL, Jämtin chose to move back to Sweden and signed a two-year deal with the Swedish Elitserien team Linköpings HC.

Career statistics

Regular season and playoffs

International

Awards 
 Winner of TV-pucken with Stockholm A in 1999.
 Swedish Champion with HV71 in 2004 and 2008.

References

External links 

1983 births
AIK IF players
Charlotte Checkers (1993–2010) players
Detroit Red Wings draft picks
Färjestad BK players
Hartford Wolf Pack players
HV71 players
Linköping HC players
Living people
KHL Medveščak Zagreb players
Swedish ice hockey forwards
Sheffield Steelers players
Swedish expatriate ice hockey players in Finland
Swedish expatriate ice hockey players in the United States
HC TPS players